= Silicon Quantum Electronics Workshop =

The Silicon Quantum Electronics Workshop (SiQEW) is a series of workshops on silicon quantum computing that date back to 2007.
